R46 or R-46 may refer to:

Roads 
 R46 expressway (Czech Republic), now the D46 motorway
 R46 (South Africa)

Other uses 
 R-46 (missile), a Soviet intercontinental ballistic missile
 R46 (New York City Subway car)
 Escadrille R46, a unit of the French Air Force
 R46: May cause heritable genetic damage, a risk phrase